McCurdy Charter School (MCS) is a K–12 public school in the city of Española, New Mexico, United States, associated with a local United Methodist church. It was founded in 1912 as a mission school. The school colors are red and blue, and its mascot is the Bobcat.

References

External links

 McCurdy Charter School

Schools in Santa Fe County, New Mexico
Española, New Mexico
Educational institutions established in 1912
1912 establishments in New Mexico